Malinov is a rural locality (a khutor) in Glebovsky Selsoviet Rural Settlement, Fatezhsky District, Kursk Oblast, Russia. The population as of 2010 is 17.

Geography 
The khutor is located in the Usozha River basin (a left tributary of the Svapa in the basin of the Seym), 112 km from the Russia–Ukraine border, 35 km north-west of Kursk, 13 km south-east of the district center – the town Fatezh, 6 km from the selsoviet center – Zykovka.

Climate
Malinov has a warm-summer humid continental climate (Dfb in the Köppen climate classification).

Transport 
Malinov is located 11.5 km from the federal route  Crimea Highway as part of the European route E105, 15.5 km from the road of regional importance  (Kursk – Ponyri), 2.5 km from the road  (Fatezh – 38K-018), 5 km from the road of intermunicipal significance  (M2 "Crimea Highway" – Zykovka – Maloye Annenkovo – 38K-039), 19.5 km from the nearest railway halt 487 km (railway line Oryol – Kursk).

The rural locality is situated 36.5 km from Kursk Vostochny Airport, 159 km from Belgorod International Airport and 219 km from Voronezh Peter the Great Airport.

References

Notes

Sources

Rural localities in Fatezhsky District